Martin's Evangelical Church is a church east of Lesterville in Yankton County, South Dakota.  It was built in 1923 and was added to the National Register of Historic Places in 1980.

The church's most salient feature is its central, square tower with "tall gable wall dormers, corbeled 'machicolation' arcading, and a polygonal termination."  It has brick- and stucco-faced walls upon a concrete foundation.

References

Churches in South Dakota
Churches on the National Register of Historic Places in South Dakota
Churches completed in 1923
Churches in Yankton County, South Dakota
National Register of Historic Places in Yankton County, South Dakota